Ralph Jones  (born 1876) was a Welsh international footballer. He was part of the Wales national football team, playing 1 match on 18 March 1899 against Scotland. At club level, he played for Druids.

See also
 List of Wales international footballers (alphabetical)

References

1876 births
Welsh footballers
Wales international footballers
Druids F.C. players
Place of birth missing
Date of death missing
Association footballers not categorized by position